Thomas ("Tom") Martin Parsons (born 5 May 1984 in Birmingham, United Kingdom) is a British athlete competing in high jump.

Parsons finished 20th in the 2003 European Juniors, 17th in the 2005 European U23 championships, 10th in the 2005 World University Games, 11th at the 2006 Commonwealth Games and 10th in the World Championships at Osaka.

Parsons represented Great Britain at the 2008 Summer Olympics in the high jump where he finished 8th with a jump of 2.25.

He has a personal best of 2.30 metres outdoors (2008) and 2.31 metres indoors (2010).

Competition record

Personal life
Parsons was educated at King Edward VI Five Ways school in Birmingham. He studied for a BSC in Sport and PE at UWIC

References

1984 births
Living people
English male high jumpers
British male high jumpers
Olympic male high jumpers
Olympic athletes of Great Britain
Athletes (track and field) at the 2008 Summer Olympics
Commonwealth Games competitors for England
Athletes (track and field) at the 2006 Commonwealth Games
Athletes (track and field) at the 2010 Commonwealth Games
Athletes (track and field) at the 2014 Commonwealth Games
Competitors at the 2005 Summer Universiade
British Athletics Championships winners
Alumni of Cardiff Metropolitan University
People educated at King Edward VI Five Ways